Hemchand Yadav (1 December 1958 - 11 April 2018) was an Indian politician and a member of Bharatiya Janata Party. He was cabinet minister in Government of Chhattisgarh from 2003 to 2013.

Early life 
Yadav was born to small farmer Ramlal Yadav in Durg. He married Leela Yadav on 9 March 1976 and they have four children, two sons and two daughter.
In 1987, he became active in politics.

Political career 
Yadav was first elected to Madhya Pradesh Legislative Assembly in 1998 from Durg Constituency by defeating his congress rival Arun Vora by a margin of 3,279. After creation of Chhattisgarh Legislative Assembly, he contested 2003 assembly election and won by a huge of 22,573 and became Cabinet minister water resources, sports and youth welfare in Raman Singh's Cabinet.
He held various portfolios such as Water resources, Sports and Youth welfare, Transport, Food, Civil Supply, Higher & Technical education till 2013.
Hemchand Yadav Vishwavidyalaya is named after him.

See also 
Hemchand Yadav Vishwavidyalaya, Durg

References

Chhattisgarh MLAs 2008–2013
State cabinet ministers of Chhattisgarh
1958 births
2018 deaths
Chhattisgarh MLAs 2003–2008
Chhattisgarh MLAs 2000–2003
Bharatiya Janata Party politicians from Chhattisgarh
People from Durg
Madhya Pradesh MLAs 1998–2003